Madhavaram is a state assembly constituency in the Chennai district of Tamil Nadu, India formed after constituency delimitation with more than 2 lakh voters. Its State Assembly Constituency number is 9. It is included in the Thiruvallur Lok Sabha constituency. It consists of areas like Mathur MMDA, Manali, Milk Colony, Ponniammedu, Madhavaram, Puzhal. It was divided from the Ambattur taluk. It is one of the 234 State Legislative Assembly Constituencies in Tamil Nadu.

Election results

2021

2016

2011

References

Assembly constituencies of Tamil Nadu
Tiruvallur district